Friends Forever is a Singaporean-Malaysian produced dramedy series. It stars Tracy Lee, Julian Hee , Melvin Sia , Andie Chen & Tiffany Leong as the casts of the series. It features both Singaporean and Malaysian actors and is the 16th international co-production of MediaCorp TV (Singapore) and ntv7 (Malaysia). The Chinese title (我爱麻糍 wo ai ma zi) refers to "muar chee" (zh), a popular sticky rice cake, and alludes to how friendship binds together a group of individuals.

Cast
Tracy Lee 李美玲 as Amy 李静华
Julian Hee 许立桦 as Lung 林志龙
Melvin Sia 谢佳见 as Derek 陈迪克
Andie Chen 陈邦鋆 as Jeff 石健明
Tiffany Leong 梁丽芳 as Funny 蔡若楠
Kyo Chen 庄仲维 as Bill 刘俊標
Moo Yan Yee 巫恩仪 as Ruby 张慧君
Chew Sin Huey 石欣卉 as Yoyo 陈子珊
Hishiko Woo  
Alvin Wong

References

Chinese-language drama television series in Malaysia
Singapore Chinese dramas
Singapore–Malaysia television co-productions
2010 Malaysian television series debuts
2010 Malaysian television series endings
2010 Singaporean television series debuts
2010 Singaporean television series endings
2010s Malaysian television series
2010s Singaporean television series
NTV7 original programming
Channel 8 (Singapore) original programming